Asperdaphne esperanza is a species of sea snail, a marine gastropod mollusk in the family Raphitomidae.

Description
The length of the shell attains 5.3 mm, its diameter 2 mm.

(Original description) The dull white shell is high, attenuate anteriorly. It contains six whorls, strongly angular, and including a smooth blunt two-whorled protoconch. A strong keel angles the periphery, another less strong halfway to the lower suture, and a third margins the suture. On the upper slope are two or more faint spirals. Numerous axial lirae cancellate the shell and pass over the keels, rendering them nodulous. They disappear on the lower part of the body whorl, which is occupied by about eight smooth spirals. The aperture is subquadrate, contracted in front to form a short open siphonal canal. The outer lip is strongly angled at the carena, forming a wide, triangular sinus; below corrugated by the sculpture. The inner lip is curved.

Distribution
This marine species is endemic to Australia and occurs off Tasmania.

References

 May, W.L. 1923. An illustrated index of Tasmanian shells: with 47 plates and 1052 species. Hobart : Government Printer 100 pp.

External links
  Hedley, C. 1922. A revision of the Australian Turridae. Records of the Australian Museum 13(6): 213-359, pls 42-56 
 

esperanza
Gastropods described in 1911
Gastropods of Australia